Alcatraz water tower is on Alcatraz Island in the San Francisco Bay, off the coast of San Francisco, California.  It is located on the northwestern side of the island, near Tower No. 3, beyond the Morgue and Recreation Yard. The water tank is situated on six cross-braced steel legs submerged in concrete foundations.

History

As Alcatraz had no water supply of its own, it had to import it from the mainland, brought by tug and barge. During the island's military years, it was stored in ground tanks and cisterns situated on the roof of the citadel. The water tower was built in 1940–41 by the Federal Bureau of Prisons.

It was used to store potable water for drinking, water for firefighting, and water for the island's service laundry facility. During the Occupation of Alcatraz, the water tower was subject to heavy graffiti by the Native Americans and has since become a cultural landmark. Graffiti included "Peace and Freedom Welcome to the home of the Free Indian Land" and "free Indian land -- Indians welcome."

The tower has been empty since 1963 and has deteriorated, rusted by the salt air and wind. From November 2011 through April 2012, the tower was given a US$1.1 million restoration to prevent "irreparable damage and loss of important historic resources". Steel components were replaced and the tower was seismically upgraded. The lead paint was sanded and the tower repainted with marine paint.  They repainted the famous graffiti.   The tower has been completely stabilized. The slope below the Warden's House has been the subject of structural remediation as it was deteriorating.

References

Water towers in California
Alcatraz Island
Towers completed in 1941
1941 establishments in California